No Gamble, No Future is an American poker television program that airs on PokerGO, and premiered on August 1, 2022. The original series was announced by PokerGO on July 21, 2022, and provide cash game-focused entertainment with a variety of stakes and players partaking.

The show is filmed exclusively in the PokerGO Studio at ARIA Resort & Casino in Las Vegas, Nevada, and is hosted by Brent Hanks and Jeff Platt.

History 
No Gamble, No Future began as a video podcast in January 2021 with Hanks and Platt as the hosts. The show aired on Tuesdays across PokerGO's YouTube and Facebook channels and discussed poker, sports, and gambling.

Guests included Phil Hellmuth, Daniel Negreanu, Nick Schulman, Ali Nejad, Antonio Esfandiari, Tom Dwan, Barstool Sports' Ben Mintz, and Fox Sports 1's Nick Wright.

While the podcast was on break, No Gamble, No Future remained a popular PokerGO brand before it evolved into a cash game show to be aired on video streaming service PokerGO.

In February 2023, No Gamble, No Future aired Cash of the Titans that featured a hand between Patrik Antonius and Eric Persson that totaled $1,978,000 and broke the record for largest pot in U.S. poker stream history.

Episodes

Season 1 (2022) 
Season 1 was taped in July 2022 from inside the PokerGO Studio at ARIA Resort & Casino in Las Vegas, Nevada.

 Week 5 was a $10,000 buy-in sit-n-go. Maria Ho defeated Faizal Khoja and won $50,000.

Season 2 (2023) 
In February 2023, No Gamble, No Future premiered Cash of the Titans that featured Andrew Robl, Eric Persson, Rob Yong, Markus Gonsalves, Matthew Gonzales, and Patrik Antonius. The buy-in was $1,000,000 and stakes began at $500/$500 blinds that escalated every three hours over three days. Each player put $100,000 on the side, and the player that won the most money would win the $600,000 side pot. On the final hand day of filming, there was a $1,978,000 pot between Antonius and Persson that set the record for the biggest pot in U.S. poker stream history. 

Antonius bet $40,000 on the  flop and Persson raised to $140,000. Yong folded and Antonius reraised to $250,000. Antonius bet $150,000 and Persson moved all-in. Following the record-breaking pot, there were three pots of $1,657,000, $1,298,000, and $1,269,000 that also amounted to larger than the previous $1,158,000 record pot that was set in December 2022 on Hustler Casino Live.

It was announced during Cash of the Titans that episodes for Season 2 would be available on PokerGO in the upcoming months.

Results

Season 1 (2022)

References 

Television shows about poker
Television shows set in Las Vegas
Poker in North America
2022 American television series debuts
Poker in Las Vegas